Diego Rafael Higa (born March 18, 1997), is a Professional Racing Driver, Drifting Professor and Netflix Hyperdrive Champion, from Santos, Brazil. Diego is the reference in Drifting in Brazil and has already won more than 38 trophies in his career and was awarded the Golden Helmet by Brazilian Automobile Confederation in 2019. 

He's currently competing in the United States Formula Drift 2023, by way of collaboration with JDMsupreme. Diego is one of only 50 professional drivers allowed to compete the highly coveted stateside drift series. Diego's first attempt at Formula Drift is backed by winning another 22' SuperDrift championship in Brasil, driving his Nissan 350Z, based in Santos, at NSC Garage. He is the owner of Diego Higa's Drifting School, in which he teaches his unique Drifting style, and is one of World's top prospects in the sport.

Higa also finished as a runner-up in the 2016 King of Nations Drift World Championship, when aged only 16, and holds the records for the most titles (4) in Brazilian Championship, most titles in a row (4) in Brazilian Championship, most tiles (6) in SuperDrift Brasil, and most titles in a row (6) in SuperDrift Brasil.

Early life and career 
Born in Santos, Brazil, a coastal city and major port hub in Latin America, Higa begun in BMX.when he was 10 years old. At the age of 13, he started into Motorsport, first in go-karting, then changed to Drifting by influence of his father, who wad contact with Drift when he lived in Japan. Diego's first Drift Car was a Chevrolet Omega Suprema. Despite being a wagon not properly suited to Drifting, he managed to master the base skills and quickly moved to more suitable cars, reaching his favourite and still actual Nissan 350Z.

As a teenager, Higa started working with his parents, Neto and Karen Higa, at their NSC garage, focused in tuning cars for Drifting. There, Diego learned how to setup his own on cars and started competing in Drifting Championships. His first major championship was the 2015 SuperDrift Brasil, the top tier league in Latin America, at the age of 18. In the following year, the came second in the World Championship (King of Nations Drift), in which he entered a Nissan R34 Skyline. In 2016, also he clinched his first Brazilian Championship, certified by the Brazilian Automobile Confederation (CBA).

Netflix Hyperdrive 
In 2019, aged only 21, Diego was invited to take part in Netflix upcoming Drift-based series, called Hyperdrive. 

Diego entered the competition running a #69 2006 Ford Mustang V8, sponsored by NSC Garage, Rodera and FuelTech, coached by his father. After a fierce competition, Diego qualified in his battery at first and managed to keep the best pace to clinch the title in an awesome run against Axel François and Fielding Shredder.

Spin-offs and drifting school 
Diego did a lot of exhibitions with famous people or to the public places, like with the Brazilian Red Bull ProSkater Letícia Bufoni, or with the YouTuber, Influencer and Gamer Nyvi Estephan, in a campaign for the launch of Riot Games' new WildRift. He also has a viral video Drifting inside a gas station, between the pumps, sponsored by Portal de Santos. He also practices and regularly uses a private racetrack in the city of Registro, in the southern part of the State of São Paulo, where his Drifting School is based.

Professional drifting career

2015 
SuperDrift Brasil Champion for the first time.

2016 
Back-to-back SuperDrift Brasil Champion and Brazilian Champion for the first time. Runner-up at the King of Nations Drift World Championship.

2017 
SuperDrift Brasil Champion for the 3rd-time in a row, and Brazilian Champion for the second consecutive run.

2018 
SuperDrift Brasil Champion for the 4th-time in a row, and Brazilian Champion for the 3rd-time in a row.

2019 
SuperDrift Brasil Champion for the 5th-time in a row, and Brazilian Champion for the 4th-time in a row. Netflix Hyperdrive Champion, finished 1st in his qualifier and in the final stage.

2020 
SuperDrift Brasil Champion for the 6th-time in a row. Did not enter in the Brazilian Championship.

References 

1997 births
Living people
Racing drivers
People from Santos, São Paulo